Dina Fagimovna Garipova (born 25 March 1991) is a Russian singer. In 2012, Garipova won the Russian version of singing competition The Voice, Golos. Garipova was selected by the Russian broadcaster Channel One to represent Russia at the Eurovision Song Contest 2013 in Malmö, Sweden, with the song "What If". At the competition, she qualified from the first semi-final and placed fifth in the final, scoring 174 points. In 2015, Garipova was one of five jurors for Russia in the Eurovision Song Contest 2015.

Biography
Garipova was born on 25 March 1991, in Zelenodolsk, Tatarstan, Russia, to a family of physicians. From the age of six, Garipova studied singing at the "Zolotoy mikrofon" (Golden Microphone) Theatre, with Elena Antonova as her vocal coach. Garipova studied journalism (correspondence department) at the Kazan (Volga region) Federal University. When Garipova graduated from "Zolotoy mikrofon", she toured with the Tatarstan singer Gabdelfat Safin.

Dina's vocal range is 2.4 octaves.

Dina is of ethnic Tatar descent and is Sunni Muslim.

The Voice

Dina auditioned in 2012 to compete in season 1 of The Voice. In the blind auditions, broadcast on 26 October 2012 on Channel One, she sang "А напоследок я скажу". Only Alexander Gradsky turned his chair for her at the last few seconds of the performance.

The Voice performances

Discography

Studio albums

Singles

References

External links

1991 births
Living people
People from Zelenodolsk, Russia
Tatar people of Russia
Russian Sunni Muslims
Eurovision Song Contest entrants of 2013
Eurovision Song Contest entrants for Russia
The Voice (franchise) winners
Russian mezzo-sopranos
Articles containing video clips
21st-century Russian singers
21st-century Russian women singers